John Thorn (12 December 1847 – 30 April 1896) was a politician in Queensland, Australia. He was a Member of the Queensland Legislative Assembly.

Early life
John Thorn was born on 12 December 1847 at Ipswich, Queensland, the son of George Thorn (senior), a Member of the Queensland Legislative Assembly, and his wife Jane (née Handcock). He was educated at Ipswich Grammar School.

He married Frances Augusta March, on 3 February 1875 in Sydney. The couple had 5 sons and 2 daughters.

Politics
His brother George Thorn had represented the seat of Fassifern in the Queensland Legislative Assembly until he resigned on 9 January 1874 to be appointed to the Queensland Legislative Council on that day. John Thorn won the resulting by-election in Fassifern on 24 January 1874.

He held the seat until he resigned on 12 March 1878. His resignation was due to his being a partner in the firm Annear & Co, who had been the successful tenderers for a contract to build the railway line from Gympie to Maryborough. de Burgh Fitzpatrick Persse won the resulting by-election on 9 April 1878.

Later life
John Thorn died on 30 April 1896 at Brisbane and was buried in Toowong Cemetery.

See also
 Members of the Queensland Legislative Assembly, 1873–1878

References

Members of the Queensland Legislative Assembly
1847 births
1896 deaths
Burials at Toowong Cemetery
19th-century Australian politicians